Ștefan Musei (born 10 December 1995) is a Romanian luger. He competed in the men's doubles event at the 2018 Winter Olympics.

References

1995 births
Living people
Romanian male lugers
Olympic lugers of Romania
Lugers at the 2018 Winter Olympics
Place of birth missing (living people)
Lugers at the 2012 Winter Youth Olympics